Ashok Kumar is a Telugu comedian and actor. He was first appeared in Doordharshan-8. Ashok kumar acted in TV comedy serials and movies.

Filmography
Bahubali 2 The conclusion
       Aalasyam Amrutham
       Vengamamba
	Ullasamga Utsahamga
	Subhapradam
	Aayudham
	Adirindayya Chandram
	Aithe
	Alibaba Adbuta Deepam
       Bharat Bandh
	Choopulu Kalisina Subhavela
	Gautama Buddha
	Hai Hai Nayaka
	Irugillu Porugillu
	Law and Order
	Manasu
	Nagaram
	Pokiri Raja
	Prema Zindabad
	Samanyudu
	Seetayya
	Subhavaartha
       Takkari Donga
	Sutradharulu
	Theerpu
	Time Pass
	Vandha Kotlu
       Osay ramulamma

References
 Ashok Kumar
  ]

External links
 TORI Live Show With Actor Ashok Kumar at TeluguPeople.com Videos
 RadioKhushi.com - Tollywood/news/ashok kumar daughter wedding reception Picture Gallery
 Ashok Kumar
 

Living people
Telugu comedians
Telugu male actors
Year of birth missing (living people)